The GiMA Best Male Playback Singer Award is given by Global Indian Music Academy as a part of its annual Global Indian Music Academy Awards for Hindi films, to recognise a male playback singer who has delivered an outstanding performance in a film song.

Superlatives

List of winners
 2010 Shaan, Shantanu Moitra for "Behti Hawa Sa Tha Woh"  – 3 Idiots
 2011 Mohit Chauhan for "Pee Loon"  – Once Upon A Time In Mumbaai
 KK for "Zindagi Do Pal Ki " – Kites
 Mohit Chauhan, Shekhar Ravjiani for "Tujhe Bhula Diya" – Anjaana Anjaani
 Rahat Fateh Ali Khan for "Tere Mast Mast Do Nain" – Dabangg
 Shafqat Amanat Ali for "Bin Tere" – I Hate Luv Storys
 2012 Mohit Chauhan, A. R. Rahman for "Nadaan Parindey"  – Rockstar
 Akon for "Chammak Challo" – Ra.One
 A. R. Rahman, Javed Ali, Mohit Chauhan for "Kun Faya Kun" – Rockstar
 Mika Singh for "Subha Hone Na De" – Desi Boyz
 Mohit Chauhan for "Sadda Haq" – Rockstar
 2013 – No award given
 2014 Arijit Singh for "Tum Hi Ho"  – Aashiqui 2
 Ankit Tiwari for "Sunn Raha Hai" – Aashiqui 2
 Arijit Singh for "Laal Ishq" – Goliyon Ki Raasleela Ram-Leela
 Benny Dayal for "Badtameez Dil" – Yeh Jawaani Hai Deewani
 Tochi Raina for "Kabira" – Yeh Jawaani Hai Deewani
 2015 Arijit Singh for "Muskurane" – CityLights
 Ankit Tiwari for "Galliyan" – Ek Villain
 Armaan Malik for "Auliya" – Ungli
 Arijit Singh for "Suno Na Sangemarmar" – Youngistaan
 Labh Janjua for "London Thumakda" – Queen
 Sukhwinder Singh for "Bismil" – Haider
 2016 Papon for "Moh Moh Ke Dhage" – Dum Laga Ke Haisha
 Arijit Singh for "Aayat" – Bajirao Mastani
 Arijit Singh for "Khamoshiyan" – Khamoshiyan
 Mohit Chauhan for "Matargashti" – Tamasha
 Arijit Singh for "Sooraj Dooba Hain" – Roy

See also
 Bollywood
 Cinema of India

References

Global Indian Music Academy Awards